Olly, like the similarly spelt Ollie, is a variant of the given names Olivia and Oliver. Notable people and characters with this form of the name include:

People 
 Olly Alexander (born 1990), British musician, actor, television presenter and LGBTQ advocate
 Olly Ashall-Bott (born 1997), English rugby league footballer who plays as a full-back or wing for the Widnes Vikings
 Olly Cracknell (born 1994), Welsh rugby union player who plays for Ospreys regional team as a flanker
 Olly Croft (1929–2019), darts administrator
 Olly Dondokambey (born 1961), Indonesian politician
 Olly Donner (1881-1956), Finnish writer
 Olly Flynn (born 1950), English race walker
 Olly Gebauer (1908–1937), Austrian film actress
 Olly Hicks, British kayaker, explorer and inspirational speaker
 Olly Holzmann (1915–1995), Austrian dancer and film actress
 Olly Kohn (born 1981), Welsh international rugby union player for Harlequins having previously played for Bristol and Plymouth Albion
 Olly Mann (born 1981), British presenter
 Olly Martins (born 1969), British politician
 Olly Moss (born 1987), English graphic artist
 Olly Murs (born 1984), English singer, songwriter, television presenter and dancer
 Olly Robinson (born 1991), English rugby union player who plays for Cardiff Blues as a flanker
 Olly Simpson (born 1998), Australian motorcycle racer
 Olly Stone (born 1993), English cricketer
 Olly Taylor (footballer) (born 1993), English footballer
 Olly Westbury (born 1997), English cricketer
 Olly Williams, British wildlife painter
 Olly Woodburn (born 1991), English rugby union player for Exeter Chiefs

Characters 
 Olly (mascot), one of the mascots of the 2000 Summer Olympics in Sydney
 Olly (Game of Thrones), in the Game of Thrones series
 Olly, a character in The Sifl and Olly Show
 Olly Manthrope-Hall, a character in the British soap opera EastEnders: E20
 King Olly, a character in Paper Mario: The Origami King

Other 
 Olly (company), a vitamins company

See also 
 Holly (disambiguation)
 Ollie (disambiguation)
 Olli (disambiguation)
 Oli (disambiguation)
 Oly (disambiguation)